Walt Disney (1901–1966) was a filmmaker and co-founder of the entertainment empire bearing his name.

Walt Disney may also refer to:
Walt Disney (film), the 2015 documentary that aired on American Experience
The Walt Disney Company, American diversified multinational mass media and entertainment corporation
Walt Disney Pictures, a movie studio
Walt Disney, a Walt Disney anthology television series from 1981 to 1983
No. 1 "Walter E. Disney", a locomotive of the Walt Disney World Railroad

See also
Disney (disambiguation)
Disney family
Walt Disney World Resort, a resort in Orlando, Florida